P2X purinoceptor 5 is a protein that in humans is encoded by the P2RX5 gene.

The product of this gene belongs to the family of purinoceptors for ATP. This receptor functions as a ligand-gated ion channel. Several characteristic motifs of ATP-gated channels are present in its primary structure, but, unlike other members of the purinoceptors family, this receptor has only a single transmembrane domain. Four transcript variants encoding distinct isoforms have been identified for this gene.

See also
 P2X receptor

References

Further reading

External links 
 

Ion channels